The fourth season of the American television comedy series Rules of Engagement premiered as a mid-season entry on March 1, 2010 and concluded on May 24, 2010. It consists of 13 episodes, each running approximately 22 minutes in length. CBS broadcast the fourth season on Mondays at 8:30 pm in the United States between How I Met Your Mother and Two and a Half Men.

Cast

Main Cast
 Patrick Warburton as Jeff Bingham
 Megyn Price as Audrey Bingham
 Oliver Hudson as Adam Rhodes
 Bianca Kajlich as Jennifer Morgan
 David Spade as Russell Dunbar
 Adhir Kalyan as Timmy Patel

Recurring Cast
 Diane Sellers as Doreen
 Nazneen Contractor as Suneetha

Episodes

Note: The events in episode 1 of season five ("Surro-gate") take place in the immediate aftermath of the events in episode 10 of season four ("The Surrogate"), with the events in episodes 11, 12 and 13 of season four taking place outside of the story line of "The Surrogate" and "Surro-gate."

Ratings

References

2010 American television seasons